Barry Brennan may refer to:

 Barry Brennan (Galway footballer) (born 1958), Irish Gaelic footballer, 1981 All Star winner
 Barry Brennan (Laois footballer), Irish Gaelic footballer, 2003 Leinster winner
 Barry Brennan (rugby league), Fortitude Valley Diehards player